Kaye Scholer was a law firm founded in 1917 by Benjamin Kaye and Jacob Scholer. The firm had more than 450 attorneys in nine offices located in the cities of Chicago, Frankfurt, London, Los Angeles, New York City (headquarters), Shanghai, Palo Alto, Washington, D.C., and West Palm Beach.

In late 2016, Kaye Scholer voted to merge with Washington D.C.-based law firm Arnold & Porter to create a $1 billion+ sized multinational firm with a large offering both in the US and internationally. The merger was effected on January 1, 2017, as Arnold & Porter Kaye Scholer LLP, later modified to operating as Arnold & Porter, in February 2018.

Reputation and recognition
Kaye Scholer was internationally known for being a leading litigation firm. Its particular areas of litigation strength include antitrust, intellectual property, and products liability. In 2008, Kaye Scholer was named Product Liability Firm of the Year by Chambers and Partners. In 2005, 2006 and 2007, The National Law Journal named Kaye Scholer to its list of top 10 elite litigation defense firms, making Kaye Scholer the only law firm to appear on this list for the three years it had run. In 2006, The American Lawyer magazine selected Kaye Scholer as the products liability litigation firm of the year. In 2013, Law360 selected Kaye Scholer's product liability practice as one of its Practice Groups of the Year. Kaye Scholer was one of only five firms singled out for product liability by the publication.

Kaye Scholer also had a well-developed transactional practice, including  in aviation, bankruptcy, finance, mergers and acquisitions, private equity, and real estate.

In the life sciences arena, Kaye Scholer was recognized in 2010 as "one of the most well regarded firms" for life sciences by The International Who's Who of Life Sciences Lawyers 2010. On September 10, 2009, at an awards ceremony in Basel, Switzerland, capping Novartis AG's Global Legal Meeting, Kaye Scholer received the company's first-ever Preferred Provider Award for Excellence. 
 
Kaye Scholer was one of the nation's most profitable large law firms, according to American Lawyer magazine. Kaye Scholer maintains a reputation  for being a collegial firm, something of a rarity in law firms of its size and economic success.

History
The firm was founded in 1917 in New York by Benjamin Kaye and Jacob Scholer. Scholer was a graduate of New York Law School. Kaye was a graduate of Columbia Law School and an eminent banking lawyer who was among the first lawyers to bring a federal income tax case to trial under the 1913 income tax law. Kaye was also a noted playwright who wrote plays between tax cases. The firm was known as Kaye, Scholer, Fierman, Hays and Handler for many years.

In 1958 the firm moved into brand new offices at 425 Park Avenue, between 55th and 56th Streets. This becomes the firm's New York headquarters for the next 55 years, making it one of the longest business tenants at one locale in the city's history. In fall 2014, the firm left 425 Park Avenue and moved its New York headquarters to 250 West 55th Street.

Kaye Scholer launched an office in Washington, D.C. in 1980 that now employs approximately 50 attorneys.

Charges brought by the Office of Thrift Supervision against the firm in 1992 related to its representation of Charles Keating and his bank, Lincoln Savings and Loan, generated one of the most prominent legal ethics controversies of the decade.

Kaye Scholer opened an office in West Palm Beach in 1997, where it focuses on real estate and estate planning law.

Former US Senator Abraham Ribicoff joined Kaye Scholer as senior counsel in 1981. Ribicoff had previously sponsored the bill that opened up trade between the US and China. As a result of his influence, Kaye Scholer was able to further expand into the Asian market, becoming the first New York-based firm to open a Shanghai office in 1998.

In 2001, Kaye Scholer opened offices in London and Chicago; the firm's Frankfurt office opened soon after, in 2002. In 2010, the firm opened its ninth office in Palo Alto, offering a full range of legal services to technology companies and private investment firms in Silicon Valley and Northern California.

Following the merger of London-based Clifford Chance and legacy firm Rogers & Wells, Kaye Scholer benefited from a series of key lateral partners in intellectual property and bankruptcy.

In November 2016, Kaye Scholer announced that it would be merging with Washington, D.C.-based firm Arnold & Porter LLP to form Arnold & Porter Kaye Scholer LLP, with approximately 1000 attorneys across nine domestic and four international offices. The merger took effect on January 1, 2017. In February 2018, The National Law Journal reported that the newly combined "firm has quietly reversed its post-merger branding efforts" and "scrubbed nearly all mention of ”Kaye Scholer” from its public image, changing its brand name, email addresses and web domain", while retaining the legal entity name in full.

Notable mandates

Transactional
Representing Skilled Healthcare Group, Inc. in its definitive agreement to combine with Genesis HealthCare, one of the nation's largest providers of post-acute care services.
Advised Sapheon, Inc., a privately held developer of venous disease treatments, in its acquisition by Covidien plc. 
Advised longtime client Pfizer Inc. in its agreement to acquire InnoPharma, Inc., a privately held pharmaceutical development company.
Advised VanDeMark Chemical Inc., the largest, independent manufacturer of phosgene and phosgene derivatives in North America, in its acquisition of Framochem Kft from ISOCHEM S.A.S., a company belonging to Germany's AURELIUS Group, and the related debt and equity financings in connection with the acquisition.
Advised ultra premium tequila brand Avion Tequila in its agreement to sell a majority stake in the Avion Spirits LLC joint venture to Pernod Ricard USA.
Represented Healthy Directions, LLC along with its equity holders, including longtime clients American Securities and ACI Capital, in the recently announced sale of Healthy Directions to Helen of Troy Limited. 
Represented leading private equity firm American Securities in its acquisition, from Morgan Stanley Global Private Equity, of Learning Care Group (US) Inc. in partnership with the Company's management team. 
Represented Omega Healthcare Investors, Inc. as the borrower in a $1.2 billion unsecured syndicated credit facility with Bank of America, N.A., as administrative agent, and Merrill Lynch, Pierce, Fenner & Smith Incorporated, as joint lead arranger and sole book runner.
Advised real estate investment trust Five Oaks Investment Corp (FOIC) (NYSE: OAKS) in a $75 million at-the-market (ATM) facility launched on May 30, 2014 with Mitsubishi UFJ Securities (USA) Inc, BTIG LLC and Keefe, Bruyette & Woods Inc.
Advised Novartis on the intellectual property-related aspects of a series of strategic deals totaling $30 billion, including the landmark acquisition of GlaxoSmithKline's oncology unit for up to $16 billion.
Advised the shareholders of German pharmaceutical company Activaero GmbH, Gmünden in the sale of all their shares to Vectura Group plc for a total of €130 million, funded through a combination of cash payments and Vectura shares. 
Advised the shareholders of Pharmalink Consulting, a leading global provider of regulatory affairs consulting services to the life sciences industry, on the sale of the company to business processes and operations provider Genpact Ltd.
Represented Onex Corporation and The Warranty Group in the sale of The Warranty Group to TPG. 
Represented American Securities in its acquisition of Frontier Spinning Mills Holding Corp. from an affiliate of Sun Capital Partners, Inc. 
Represented technology infrastructure and hosting company Hostway in that company's sale to CT-based private investment firm Littlejohn & Co, LLC.
Advised Pfizer in the company's licensing agreement with Kissei Pharmaceutical Co., Ltd., which grants exclusive rights to Pfizer to develop and commercialize the investigational therapy KUX-1151 for gout and hyperuricemia. 
Advised investment firm Schilling Ventures, LLC as co-sponsor in the acquisition, together with co-sponsor Prospect Partners, of Cyclonaire Corporation, in partnership with management.
Advised PDM Bridge, LLC, a steel fabricator that produces steel components for the largest and most complex bridge structures, in the acquisition by Atlas Holdings of certain PDM Bridge assets.
Represented Criterion Real Estate Capital LLC and Wells Fargo Bank, N.A. in originating mortgage and mezzanine financing to finance the acquisition of the Park Lane Hotel on Central Park South. The borrower was The Witkoff Group and its partners. 
Advised Hastings Insurance Group, one of Europe's fastest growing insurance businesses, in definitive agreements that gave Goldman Sachs Merchant Banking Division 50 percent of the voting share capital of the Group. 
Represented private aviation membership-based company Wheels Up in its placement of a nearly $1.4 billion order with the reorganized Beechcraft Corp., formerly Hawker Beechcraft.
Advised Debussy DTC PLC as Issuer in relation to the £263m CMBS transaction arranged by Cairn Capital in order to refinance the UK property portfolio of Toys R Us. 
 Represented Fairmount Minerals Inc., a leading global producer of high grade industrial sand and value-added sand products including resin coated sand and ceramics, in three strategic acquisitions over the course of four months. This includes the acquisition of FTS International's (FTSI) proppant business, including certain sand mining plants, resin-coating plants, and distribution terminals.
 Advised leading private equity firm J.W. Childs Associates, L.P in the sale of JA Holding, Inc. to specialty retailer Men's Wearhouse.
Represented Meggitt-USA in its sale of one of its subsidiaries, formerly known as Keith Products, to Air Comm Corporation (ACC). 
Represented Novartis on the purchase, by generics division Sandoz, of specialty dermatology generics company Fougera Pharmaceuticals for $1.525 billion in an all-cash transaction. 
Represented longtime client Onex Corporation in its $2.3 billion acquisition of USI Insurance Services LLC from a private fund managed by Goldman Sachs Group Inc. 
Advised Bregal Capital, a leading European private equity firm, in the management buy-out of Ideal Stelrad, a UK-based manufacturer of boilers and radiators, for approximately £230 million. 
Represented Bregal Capital in the sale of Mirror Controls International (MCi), the world's leading manufacturer of rearview mirror and mirror powerfold actuators for the automotive industry, to private equity firm Egeria in August 2012. In early 2012, Buyouts named the transaction its "European Deal of the Year."
Advised The Cooper Spirits Company, maker of artisanal elderflower liqueur St-Germain, in that product's acquisition by the world's largest privately held spirits company, Bacardi.
Helped GlaxoSmithKline Vaccines structure and negotiate its complex public-private collaborative partnership arrangements with The Texas A&M University System, Kalon Biotherapeutics and the US Department of Health and Human Services/Biomedical Advanced Research and Development Authority for the development and manufacture of vaccines to protect against pandemic and seasonal influenza.
Advised private equity fund Moelis Capital Partners, as owners of portfolio company Dr. Fresh LLC, in the acquisition of REACH® brand toothbrushes from the Johnson & Johnson Healthcare Products Division of McNEIL-PPC, Inc.
Represented Wind Point Partners in multiple acquisitions of consumer products companies, including certain assets of Consolidated Biscuit Company, and on the same day, the Cereal Division of Golden Temple of Oregon, LLC, a leading manufacturer and marketer of all-natural ready-to-eat cereals, bulk granola and granola snacks. 
Advised Essie Cosmetics in its agreement to be acquired by L'Oréal USA. 
Represented Sandoz in its agreement to acquire Oriel Therapeutics, a privately held US pharmaceuticals company. 
Advised Jarden Corporation, a leading provider of niche consumer products used in and around the home, in multiple acquisitions, including its acquisition of the Mapa Spontex baby care and home care businesses of French conglomerate Total S.A.
Represented ASP Westward, a portfolio company of American Securities, and publisher of 60 weekly and daily newspapers, in its acquisition of two East-Texas newspapers from Cox Enterprises Inc.
Represented Parsons Brinckerhoff Inc. in connection with the merger agreement with Balfour Beatty plc. 
 Represented the nine-person special committee of Harrah's board of directors in the $27.8B sale of Harrah's Entertainment Inc. to private equity firms TPG and Apollo Management in 2008. 
Advised WCI Steel along with Boston law firm McDermott Will & Emery in its acquisition by OAO Severstal in 2008, a transaction valued at $327 million.
Represented Onex Corporation in its acquisition of the Health Group of Eastman Kodak Company for cash consideration of $2.35 billion in 2007.
Represented Onex Corporation in its acquisition of the Wichita/Tulsa division of Boeing Commercial Airplanes for consideration of $.9 billion in cash in 2005.
Previously represented Onex Corporation and Oaktree Capital Management in their C$2 billion disposal of Loews Cineplex Entertainment Corporation to Bain Capital in 2004.
Advised Chef America Inc. in its acquisition by Nestle SA for total consideration of $2.6 billion in cash and debt. The deal closed in October 2002.
Advised RCA in the formation of a joint venture with Bertelsmann called RCA/Ariola International in 1985.

Litigation
Successfully obtained an order from the United States Judicial Panel on Multidistrict Litigation denying the centralization of two actions filed against clients Endo Pharmaceuticals Inc. and Vintage Pharmaceuticals, LLC d/b/a Qualitest Pharmaceuticals.
Helped client The Hershey Company successfully secure a preliminary injunction against a Maryland State Senator's copying of Hershey trade dress, including the word HERSHEY in white block type on a dark brown background.
Helped client King Pharmaceuticals, an indirect subsidiary of Pfizer, defeat class certification in a major pharmaceutical antitrust litigation concerning King's muscle relaxant Skelaxin. 
Played a key role in obtaining the dismissal of a putative class action brought in the US District Court for the Southern District of New York against Amazon.com and major publishers of electronic books, including client Penguin Random House LLC. 
Successfully represented Kenneth Cole Productions Inc. and former CEO Paul Blum in a New York Supreme Court case, brought by minority shareholders, challenging the terms under which the company would be taken private. 
Achieved a significant litigation victory for investor David Hildes, who lost approximately $25 million when his Harbinger Corporation stock was exchanged for Peregrine Systems, Inc. stock pursuant to a materially false registration statement issued by Peregrine. A three-judge panel of the U.S. Court of Appeals for the Ninth Circuit unanimously reversed an earlier district court decision barring Hildes from amending his securities complaint against certain former outside Peregrine directors, allowing Hildes to proceed with his lawsuit. 
As National Counsel to Knauf Plasterboard Tianjin (KPT), developed, negotiated and secured approval for a landmark global class action settlement and negotiated the settlement for In re: Chinese-Manufactured Drywall Products Liability Litigation.  
Obtained a $15 million verdict in favor of client Ateliers de la Haute-Garonne, a leading French airplane parts manufacturer, and its fully owned subsidiary F2C2 Systems SAS in a case alleging patent infringement, trade dress infringement, unfair competition and intentional interference with prospective economic advantage against German rival Broetje Automation and its American subsidiary Broetje Automation USA. 
Persuaded the Trademark Trial and Appeal Board to reverse the US Patent and Trademark Office's refusal to give The Hershey Company a trademark registration for the design of its iconic chocolate bar.
Represented ConsumerInfo.com, Inc., owner of the FreeCreditReport.com® trademark and website, and part of the Experian family of companies, in its successful suit against competitors One Technologies LP and Adaptive Marketing LLC for registering and using domain names similar to FreeCreditReport.com®.
Represented the former Chairman and CEO of IT management solutions company CA, Inc. in a series of securities class action and derivative cases.
Achieved a victory for clients Vintage Pharmaceuticals and Endo Pharmaceuticals Holdings in a 2012 case involving allegedly improperly packaged birth control pills by securing a denial of a plaintiff's motion for class certification and a partial grant of summary judgment. 
Won a California federal court order on behalf of Complete Genomics, which granted a summary judgment invalidating all nine of Illumina's claims to a patent covering a DNA sequencing method that Complete Genomics was accused of infringing. 
Obtained summary judgment for 15 of the leading brand name prescription drug manufacturers and PhRMA, their trade association, in Clayworth, et al. v. Pfizer Inc, et al., dismissing on the merits an action by California retail pharmacies alleging a conspiracy among brand name prescription drug manufacturers to fix prices in violation of the Cartwright Act, California's state antitrust law. 
Helped its clients OSI Pharmaceuticals, Inc., Pfizer, Inc. and Genentech, Inc. successfully defeat a challenge by generic drug manufacturer, Mylan Pharmaceuticals, Inc. (Mylan), which was seeking FDA approval to market a generic version of Tarceva®. 
Represented 4Kids Entertainment, Inc., an entertainment and media company that has managed the US licensing, broadcast and merchandising rights to many popular Japanese animated shows including Yu-Gi-Oh!, in the company's Chapter 11 bankruptcy. This reorganization plan was named one of the Most Successful Restructurings of 2012 by Turnarounds & Workouts. 
Successfully defended Pfizer units Wyeth and Pharmacia & Upjohn in Hines v. Wyeth, et al in West Virginia. After a three-week trial, the jury found that the clients' HT products did not cause the plaintiff's breast cancer and that plaintiff's claims were time-barred by the applicable statute of limitation. 
Represented Wyeth in a landmark victory (Wyeth v. Kappos) in January 2010, successfully challenging, at the district court level and on appeal, the U.S. Patent and Trademark Office's interpretation of the statute designed to compensate patent holders for loss of patent term due to delays in processing applications. 
Successfully preserved Pfizer's market exclusivity for its blockbuster drug Viagra, defeating a challenge by Teva Pharmaceuticals USA Inc., which was seeking FDA approval to sell a generic version of the drug. 
Served as lead patent counsel for Pfizer in a patent infringement lawsuit against Teva Pharmaceuticals in which Teva attempted to bring a generic version of Celebrex to market. 
Successful defense of Pfizer in Viagra product liability litigation over the past decade; obtaining a long line of summary judgment decisions against claims of various diseases and ailments.
Represented Cantor Fitzgerald Securities, as agent to the senior secured lenders to yellow pages publisher Caribe Media, Inc., with respect to Caribe Media's debt-for-equity restructuring. 
Successfully represented Xerox Corporation in a federal civil jury trial in which plaintiff SCM alleged that Xerox abused its patent portfolio to create a monopoly of the plain paper copy industry.

Literary history
Kaye Scholer is a law firm with a strong literary tradition, reaching back to the firm's playwright co-founder Benjamin Kaye. His most successful plays include She Couldn't Say No, which premiered on Broadway in 1926 and was adapted for the screen in 1930 and 1940. Other plays written by Kaye include I Want My Wife (1930), The Curtain Rises (1933) and On Stage (1935).

In addition, several Kaye Scholer lawyers have published successful novels. In 2005, Greenleaf Book Group Press published Two Men Before the Storm: Arba Crane's Recollection of Dred Scott And the Supreme Court Case That Started the Civil War, written by Kaye Scholer Partner Greg Wallance. The historical novel traces the series of events that led to the landmark Supreme Court ruling in Dred Scott vs. Sandford. Wallance has also authored two nonfiction books, Papa's Game (1981) and America's Soul in the Balance: The Holocaust, FDR's State Department, and the Moral Disgrace of An American Aristocracy (2012).

In fall 2012, Academy Chicago Publishers published Kaye Scholer Special Counsel Richard Smolev's debut novel, Offerings, which tells the story of the ambitious Kate Brewster, who is determined to be the first woman to run a Wall Street investment firm despite the many high-stakes obstacles that impede her progress. Smolev's second novel, the historical In Praise of Angels, was published in summer 2013.

Noted alumni
Among Kaye Scholer's alumni are Judges Denise Cote and Analisa Torres of the United States District Court for the Southern District of New York; the late former Senator Abraham Ribicoff; Kenneth Feinberg, Special Master of the U.S. Government's September 11th Victim Compensation Fund; and the late Milton Handler, a Columbia Law professor and antitrust expert who drafted laws that include the first Food and Drug Act, the National Labor Relations Act and the GI Bill of Rights.

References

External links
Official Firm Website

 
Law firms based in New York City
Law firms established in 1917